Merlin D. Hulse (born September 21, 1923) was an American politician in the state of Iowa.

Hulse was born in Clarence, Iowa. He is a farmer and former educator. He served in the Iowa State Senate from 1977 to 1985 as a Republican. As of September 2020, Hulse lives in Tipton, Iowa.

References

1923 births
Living people
Farmers from Iowa
Iowa Republicans
People from Cedar County, Iowa